Maharashtra State Film Awards, one of the prestigious awards of Marathi cinema, are awarded by the Government of Maharashtra to Marathi language films and artists. They were first awarded in 1963.

Winners

2000 
This year's award ceremony took place at Dadaji Kondadev Stadium, Thane, with the then Chief Minister of Maharashtra (late) Vilasrao Deshmukh inaugurating the function. Actor Ashok Saraf won his eleventh award for Best Actor in the Comic Role category. The following awards were presented:

 V Shantaram Lifetime Achievement Award – Bhagwan Dada and Vasant Dada Painter
 Best Film – Gabhara
 Best Actor – Sachin Khedekar for Gharabaher
 Best Actress – Aishwarya Narkar for Ghe Bharari
 Best Supporting Actor  – Suhas Palshikar for Gabhara
 Best Supporting Actress – Jyoti Chandale for Gabhara
 Best Actor in a Comic Role – Ashok Saraf
 Best Actress in a Comic Role – Neena Sawant for Bindhaast
 Best Actor (Critics) – Mohan Joshi for Gharabaher
 Best Actress (Critics) – Sukanya Kulkarni for Gharabaher
 Best Singer (Female) – Kavita Krishnamurthy for Sawai Hawaldar
 Best Singer (Male) – Shankar Mahadevan for Sakhi Majhi
 Best Lyrics – Vasu Vaidya for Bindhaast
 Best Music Director – Achyut Thakre for Ghe Bharari
 Best Screenplay – Ajit and Prashant Dalwi for Bindhaast
 Best Dialogue – Ajit and Prashant Dalwi for Bindhaast
 Best Script – Vijay Kavdekar for Gharabaher

2002 
 Best Film – Dahavi Fa
 Best Actor – Shreyas Talpade for Reshamgaath
 Best Actress – Reema Lagoo for Reshamgaath
 Best Story – Sumitra Bhave for Dahavi Fa
 Best Screenplay – Sumitra Bhave for Vastupurush
 Best Dialogue – Prashant Dalvi for Bhet
 Best Lyrics –	Sumitra Bhave for "Khushi Cheheryavarmazhya" from Dahavi Fa
 Best Music Director – Shriram Umrani for Dahavi Fa
 Best Singer (Male) – Ajit Parab for Krishnakathchi Meera
 Best Singer (Female) – Yogita Godbole for Krishnakathchi Meera
 Best Choreography – Umesh Jadhav for Aadharstambh
 Best Child Artist – Apoorva Koregoave for Bhet

2007 
 Best Film – Nital
 Best Director –  Sumitra Bhave, Sunil Sukathokar for Nital
 Best Actor – Umesh Kamat for Samar Ek Sangharsh
 Best Actress – Nandita Das for Maati Maay

2008 
This year's awards were presented at a ceremony held at the Garaware Stadium, Aurangabad.

 V Shantaram Lifetime Achievement Award – Ramesh Deo and Seema Deo
 Raj Kapoor Award – Gulzar
 Best Film – Tingya
 Best Second Film – Ewdhasa Abhaal
 Best Third Film – Checkmate
 Best Comedy Movie – Valu
 Best Director – Mangesh Hadawale for Tingya
 Best Actor – Ajinkya Deo for Vasudev Balwant Phadke
 Best Actress – Ashwini Bhave for Kadachit
 Best Child Actor – Sharad Goekar for Tingya
 Best Actor in Comedy Role – Siddharth Jadhav for De Dhakka
 Best Supporting Actor – Swapnil Joshi for Checkmate
 Best Supporting Actress – Madhavi Juvekar for Tingya
 Best Newcomer – Sonalee Kulkarni for Bakula Namdeo Ghotale
 Best Special Appearance (Actor) – Sadashiv Amrapurkar for	Kadachit
 Best Special Appearance (Actress) – Chitra Navnathe
 Best Rural Film – Mangesh Hadawale for Tingya
 Best Social Film – Rahul Dev for Vasudev Balwant Phadke
 Best Music Director – Ajay–Atul for Tujhya Majhya Sansarala
 Best Singer (Male) – Ajay–Atul for Tujhya Majhya Sansarala
 Best Singer (Female) – Arati Ankalikar-Tikkekar for De Dhakka
 Best Story – Mantri Bhandari for Ewadhasa Aabhaal
 Best Script – Girish Joshi for Kadachit
 Best Dialogue	– Mangesh Hadawale for Tingya
 Best Lyrics – Prakash Holkar	for Tingya
 Best Choreographer – Umesh Jadhav for Jabardast
 Best Art Director – Nitin Chandrakant Desai for Vasudev Balwant Phadke
 Best Lighting – Sanjay Jadhav for Checkmate
 Best Editing – Rajesh Rao for Checkmate
 Best Sound – Avdoot Wadkar for Checkmate
 Best Make-up – Pandharinath Jukar for Checkmate
 Best Costumes – Gita Godbole for Jagjivani Mahalaxmi

2009 
 Best Film – Harishchandrachi Factory 
Best Film - Jogwa
 Best Director – Paresh Mokashi for Harishchandrachi Factory
Best Director - Rajiv Patil for Jogwa
 Best Art Director – Nitin Chandrakant Desai for Harishchandrachi Factory
Best Actor - Upendra Limaye for Jogwa
Best Actress - Mukta Barve for Jogwa
Best Lyrics - Sanjay Krushnaji Patil for Jogwa
Best Music - Ajay–Atul for Jogwa
Best Costume - Neha Nupura for Jogwa

2010 
	Best Film I – Mee Shivaji Raje Bhosle Boltoy
	Best Film II – Jhing Chik Jhing ( Cogito)
	Best Film III- Platform (Sai Arts)
	Best Rural Film – Jhing Chik Jhing (Cogito)
	Best Social Film – Samruddhi Pore for Mala Aai Vhhaychy! (Samruddhi Cine World)
	Best Newcomer Producer –  Karuya Udyachi Bat (Kailas Pictures)
	Best Director I – Santosh Majrekar Mi Shivaji Raje Bhosle Boltoy
	Best Director II – Nitin Nandan for Jhing Chik Jhing	Best Director III –  Veena Lokur for Platform	Best Debut Director – Vikram Gokhale for Aaghat	Best Director Rural Film – Nitin Nandan for Jhing Chik Jhing	Best Director Social Film – Samruddhi Pore for Mala Aai Vhhaychy! 
	Best Actor – Bharat Jadhav for Jhing Chik Jhing	Best Actor – Subodh Bhave for Ranbhul	Best Actress – Madhavi Juvekar for Jhing Chik Jhing	Best Special Appearance (Male) – Prasad Oak for Ti Ratr	Best Special Appearance I (Actress) – Kadambari Kadam for Aaghat	Best Special Appearance II (Actress) – Urmila Kanitkar-Kothare for Mala Aai Vhhaychy! 
	Best Actor in a Comic Role – Pushkar Shrotri	Best Actress in a Comic Role – Suhas Paranjpe for Kon Aahe Re Tikade	Best Newcomer Actress – Mrunmayee Deshpande for Lek Mazi Gunachi	Best Story – Aaba Gaikwad for Antardah	Best Screenplay – Amol Shedge and Ajinkya Dev for Jeta	Best Dialogue – Shantanu Rode for Babu Bend Baja	Best Lyrics – Prakash Holkar for Babu Bend Baja	Best Music Director – Anand Modak for Dhusar	Best Singer (Female) – Urmila Dhangar for Durga Mahntyat Mla	Best Singer (Male) – Rajesh Datar for Samudr	Best Choreographer – Sharvari Jamenis for Samudr	Best Cinematography  – Debu Devdhar and Satish Sahastrabuddhe for Mani Mangalsutr	Best Costumes – Snigdha Akolkar for Mani Magalsutr	Best Make-up – Anil Pemgirikar for Agadbam	Best Art Director – Eknath Kadam for Mani Magalsutr	Best Sound – Dilip/Satish for Ramabai Bhimrao Ambedkar	Best Editing –  Prakash Jadhav for Ramabai Bhimrao Ambedkar	Best Advertising – Kumar Ghokale for Lalbaug Parel	Best Child Actor I – Chinmay Kambli for Jhing Chik Jhing	Best Child Actor II – Champion for Machindra Gadkar 2011 

	Best Film I – Shala (Nishad Audio Visuals)
	Best Film II – Deool (Devika Creations)
	Best Film III – Taryanche Bet (Fiveday Movies & T.V. Pvt. Ltd)
	Best Rural Film – Jan Gan Man (Golden Dream Production)
	Best Social Film – Dusrya Jagatil (Pasaydan Chitr)
	Best Debut Producer –  Gajar (Sunil Khosala and Bhibha Dutta Khosala)
	Best Director I – Sujay Dahake for Shala	Best Director II – Ravi Jadhav for Balgandharva	Best Director  III –  Kiran Yadnopavit for Taryanche Bet	Best Rural Director  – Ameet Abhyakar for Jan Gan Man	Best Social Director – Satish Randive for Dusrya Jagatil	Best Debut Director –  Ajit Vaibhavkar  for Gajar	Best Actor – Subodh Bhave for Balgandharva	Best Actress – Manasi Salvi for Sadrakshnay	Best Special Appearance (Actor) – Suhas Shirsat for Gajar	Best Special Appearance (Actress) – Jyoti Chandekar for Paulwata	Best Actor in a Comic Role – Anand Ingale for Paulwata	Best Special Appearance (Actress) – Jyoti Chandekar for Paulwata	Best Supporting Actress – Suhita Thatte for Sadrakshnay	Best Debut Actress – Sukhada Yash for Gajar	Best Child Actor – Ishan Tambe for Taryache Bet	Best Supporting Actor – Vidyadhar Joshi for Arjun	Best Choreographer – Rajesh Bhidwe for Arjun	Best Editing –  Faisal Mahadik /Imaran Mahadik  for Arjun	Best Singer (Female) – Devaki Pandit for Arjun	Best Dialogue – Sachin Darekar for Arjun	Best Story – Saurabh Bhave for Taryache Bet	Best Screenplay – Sachin Darekar for Morya	Best Lyrics – Arvind Jagtap for Dambis	Best Music Director – Narendra Bhide for Paulwata	Best Singer (Male) – Anand Bhate for Balgandharava	Best Cinematography  – Mahesh Limaye for Balgandharava	Best Art Director – Nitin Chandrakant Desai for Balgandharava	Best Sound – Christopher Robleto-Harvey for Shala	Best Costumes – Poornima Oak for Rajmata Jijau	Best Make-up – Vikram Gaikwad for Balgandharava1962
 Best actor - Gajanan Jagirdar for  Parshuram''

References

Indian film awards
Maharashtra awards
A
1963 establishments in Maharashtra
Awards established in 1963